Lieutenant-Colonel Noel Anthony Scawen Lytton, 4th Earl of Lytton  (7 April 1900 – 18 January 1985) was a British Army officer, Arabian horse fancier (of the Crabbet Arabian Stud) and writer.

Early life
Lytton was born in 1900, the son of Neville Stephen Bulwer-Lytton, 3rd Earl of Lytton and his wife, Judith Blunt-Lytton, 16th Baroness Wentworth, who later divorced. He was a descendant of the poet and adventurer Lord Byron (born 1788), via his daughter Ada Lovelace (born 1815), arguably the world's first computer programmer. Her daughter Anne Blunt (born 1837) was Noel's maternal grandmother. He wrote a memoir of her husband, his grandfather, Wilfrid Scawen Blunt. He was also a great-grandson of the author and politician Edward Bulwer-Lytton.

In 1925, Lytton and his sister Anne changed their surname to Lytton-Milbanke by deed poll, in honour of Noel's mother's succession to the Barony of Wentworth, which could pass to either of them. (They both later went back to Lytton and not Bulwer-Lytton.)

Lytton was raised just east of the Sussex town of Crawley, in the mansion built by his maternal grandparents on the grounds of their renowned horse breeding establishment, the Crabbet Arabian Stud.  He was educated at Downside School and at the Royal Military Academy Sandhurst and was commissioned in the Rifle Brigade. He later taught economics there in the 1930s.

Career
In the time between the World Wars, he served "as an administrator and keeper of the peace in the area around Lake Rudolph in Kenya."

When the British entered the Second World War, he was posted by the military to North Africa and Italy, but due to an automobile accident was invalided out to desk duty, which his son describes as extremely frustrating for someone who was used to being athletic and active. He served as administrator of the Patras District from 1944 to 1945. He was appointed an Officer of the Order of the British Empire for his service in 1945.

As part of government administration, Lytton eventually went to Yugoslavia to work with Josip Broz Tito's Partisans.

Later life
He farmed and wrote books, including a biography about his maternal grandfather and a military autobiography The Desert and the Green. Due to his family's continued interest in the Arabian horse breed, he contributed from his private collection to the W.K. Kellogg Arabian Horse Library at Cal Poly Pomona.

Marriage and children
While in Yugoslavia, Lytton met Clarissa Palmer, a daughter of Brigadier General Cyril Eustace Palmer. Lytton and Clarissa were married on 30 November 1946 and had five children:

 Lady Caroline Mary Noel Lytton (29 December 1947 - 22 August 2017), a silversmith.
 John Peter Michael Scawen Lytton, 5th Earl of Lytton (born 7 June 1950), married Ursula Komoly, a daughter of Anton Komoloy of Vienna, in 1985. They have three children.
 Hon Thomas Roland Cyril Lawrence Lytton (born 10 August 1954)
 Lady Lucy Mary Frances Lytton (born 29 January 1957)
 Lady Sarah Teresa Mary Lytton (born 15 October 1959), married P. David Nash Solly in 1984. They have 2 children:
 Isabelle Kate Solly (b.1992)
 Benedict Edward Solly (b.1995)

Noel Lytton succeeded his father as the 4th Earl of Lytton in 1951, and his mother as 17th Baron Wentworth in 1957. Both titles passed to his eldest son upon his death in 1985.

Bibliography
The Desert and the Green (1957) 
Wilfrid Scawen Blunt: A Memoir (1961)
Mickla Bendore (1962) 
Lucia in Taormina (1963)
The Stolen Desert (1966)

References

Lytton, Noel Anthony Scawen Lytton, 4th Earl of
Lytton, Noel Anthony Scawen Lytton, 4th Earl of
20th-century English nobility
104
17
Noel
Graduates of the Royal Military College, Sandhurst
Rifle Brigade officers
King's African Rifles officers
British Army personnel of World War II
Arabian breeders and trainers
20th-century dramatists and playwrights
Officers of the Order of the British Empire